State Route 156 (SR 156) is a west to east state highway in the U.S. state of California, running from State Route 1 in Castroville to State Route 152 near Hollister. It serves as part of the primary route from the Monterey Peninsula to either the San Francisco Bay Area or the California Central Valley.

Route description

The western terminus is at State Route 1 in Castroville. The eastern terminus is at State Route 152 near Hollister. Route 156 passes through Monterey, San Benito, and Santa Clara Counties. Along with US 101, it is the quickest route from the San Francisco Bay Area to the Monterey Peninsula. In addition, SR 156's connection with SR 152 allows direct access to the California Central Valley.

For its westernmost two miles (3 km), Route 156 is a freeway through Castroville, terminating at a Y-interchange with the Route 1 freeway.  There is no direct access from Route 156 West to Route 1 North or Route 1 South to Route 156 East.  Motorists who want to go from Route 1 South to Route 156 East can do so by using Route 183 South through Castroville.  Traffic heading west on Route 156 can access Route 1 North by exiting at the Route 183 interchange and heading north. The route then truncates into a two-lane road between Castroville and Prunedale. Route 156 joins U.S. 101 for the next 8 miles (13 km) before splitting off as an expressway east to San Juan Bautista. Just after the intersection with The Alameda, Route 156 returns to a 2-lane road, then curves north by northeast, with several at-grade signal intersections, including one with State Route 25. Route 156 then crosses into Santa Clara County approximately 1/4 mile (300 meters) before a divided road and terminating at State Route 152 as a partial interchange. However, motorists wishing to use westbound SR 152 must exit at Casa de Fruita as there is no direct interchange between eastbound SR 156 and westbound SR 152.

SR 156 is part of the National Highway System, a network of highways that are considered essential to the country's economy, defense, and mobility by the Federal Highway Administration.

History
The original portion of the route was defined in 1909 and ran from U.S. Route 101 to Hollister. In 1933, the remainder of the route (between Castroville and US 101 and between Hollister and Route 152) was added. It was signed as Route 156 by 1963, but was not part of the original 1934 state signage of routes. 

Route 156 was originally routed through Hollister on 4th street and turned left on San Benito Street where it shared a route with Route 25 for 1 mile (as of 2009, SR 25 was rerouted onto a bypass.) before splitting with SR 25, and meeting its current alignment at the current SR 156/ San Benito Road intersection. In 1998, Route 156 was rerouted onto a new bypass of Hollister. A stub of the original route can be seen southeast of this intersection. 

Route 156 east originally came to an intersection with US 101. This intersection became dangerous because U.S. 101 traffic didn't stop. This intersection was replaced with an interchange since then. A stub of the intersection can still be seen between the southbound on ramp and the bridge crossing U.S. 101.

Future

Highway 156 experiences heavy truck traffic as it serves as a primary route for moving people and goods  between the Monterey Peninsula and the rest of the state.  It directly links with Highway 152, one of a small number of passable routes across the Coast Ranges between Monterey Bay and the Central Valley.

Monterey County
The westernmost segment from Highway 1 to Highway 101 in Prunedale is a heavily traveled 2-lane section that has experienced numerous fatal crashes in recent years.  Environmental studies are underway to upgrade this 5-mile (8 km) section to either a 4-lane highway or fully controlled access expressway.  The Transportation Agency for Monterey County and Caltrans have narrowed the list of upgrade alternatives to one freeway and one expressway option.  Alternative 11 — the expressway option — will add a second carriageway to the existing road.  Interchanges will be constructed at Castroville Boulevard and Cathedral Oaks Road, while Oak Hills Drive will be an at-grade intersection.  Alternative 12 — the freeway option — will build a new freeway to the south of the existing roadway with an interchange at Castroville Boulevard.  Under this alternative, there will be no interchange with Cathedral Oaks Road or Oak Hills Drive.  The existing Route 156 would be converted to a frontage road providing access to Cathedral Oaks Road and Oak Hills Drive.  The environmental studies were expected to be complete in 2009, with the project originally slated for completion in 2015.  As of December 2020, only the interchange at Castroville Boulevard has been funded.

San Benito County
San Benito County and Caltrans are conducting environmental studies for widening Highway 156 from two to four lanes between Highway 101 near San Juan Bautista and the Santa Clara County line.  Interchanges are proposed with Highway 25 northwest of Hollister, Business Route 156 both north and southwest of Hollister, and Highway 101.  The entire segment may be upgraded to freeway status to eliminate delays caused by numerous traffic lights currently present in the Hollister area.

Major intersections

Business loop

State Route 156 Business is a business loop that runs along SR 156's former alignment through Hollister, California. It splits from SR 156 as San Juan Road to run east to Downtown Hollister, then heads north as San Felipe Road to rejoin the parent route.

See also

References

External links

Caltrans: Route 156 highway conditions
California Highways: Route 156
California @ AARoads.com - State Route 156

156
156
State Route 156
State Route 156
State Route 156
156
San Juan Bautista, California